134th meridian may refer to:

134th meridian east, a line of longitude east of the Greenwich Meridian
134th meridian west, a line of longitude west of the Greenwich Meridian